is a soft drink manufacturing company headquartered in Kyoto, Japan.

Headquarters
The main office was in Takatsuki, a suburb of Osaka. Their address is 3-7-13 Otsuka-machi, Takatsuki-shi, Osaka-fu 〒569-0034

The president (selected by the board of directors) is Haruki Kan.

History
In August 1961, the 7-Up company headquarters for Japan was established in Takatsuki, with production facilities opening there in April 1963.

In May 2001, Cheerio obtained a license to manufacture alcoholic beverages. In June that same year, Cheerio obtained certification for the growing and manufacturing of products labelled "organic."

Products
Amino Safeguard
Cheerio (grape, orange, apple, melon)
For
Lifeguard
Lifeguard Jungleman X
Milkyway Coenzyme
Nihon no Cider
Safeguard
Sweet Kiss
Green tea, Black tea, Wholesome tea

Advertising slogan
The advertising slogan, 'Change it for Cheerio', can be found on vending machines, the sides of buildings, and in advertisements for Cheerio's products.

References

External link
Official website

Drink companies of Japan
Companies based in Kyoto